The Coronation Futurity Stakes is a Thoroughbred horse race for 2-year-old horses foaled in Canada. It is run annually in mid-November at Woodbine Racetrack in Toronto, Ontario, Canada at a distance of  miles. Along with its turf counterpart, the Cup and Saucer Stakes, the Coronation Futurity is the richest race for two-year-olds foaled in Canada.

Inaugurated in 1902 at Toronto's Old Woodbine Racetrack, it was created in celebration of the August 9, 1902 coronation of Edward VII of the United Kingdom. The winner of the race often becomes the early favorite for next year's Queen's Plate, though the last horse to win both races was Norcliffe in 1975.

The 1963 winner was Northern Dancer who would go on to win the Kentucky Derby and Preakness Stakes and become the most important sire of the 20th century. Of note, his young jockey that day was future Canadian and U.S. Hall of Fame jockey Ron Turcotte who, ten years later, would ride Secretariat to victory in the U.S. Triple Crown series.

Sunny's Halo won the 1982 edition of the Coronation Futurity and went on to win the following year's Kentucky Derby.

Since inception, the Coronation Futurity has been contested at a variety of distances:
 4 furlongs : 1902–1909 at Old Woodbine Racetrack
  furlongs : 1909–1917 at Old Woodbine Racetrack
 5 furlongs : 1920–1926 at Old Woodbine Racetrack
 6 furlongs : 1927–1940 at Old Woodbine Racetrack
 1 mile : 1941–1948 at Old Woodbine Racetrack
 1 mile and 70 yards : 1949-1956 Old Woodbine Racetrack, 1957 at  the new Woodbine Racetrack
  miles : 1958–1960 at Woodbine Racetrack
  miles : 1961 to present at Woodbine Racetrack

The race was run on a natural dirt surface until Woodbine installed a synthetic dirt surface in 2006. In 2016, the surface was Tapeta; it was Polytrack between 2006 and 2015.

Records
Speed  record:  (at current distance of  miles)
 1:49.20 - Norcliffe (1975) - natural dirt
 1:50.91 - Martimer (2011) - Polytrack

Most wins by an owner:
 8 - Windfields Farm and/or E. P. & Winnifred Taylor (1950, 1952, 1956, 1959, 1961, 1963, 1968, 1973)

Most wins by a jockey:
 5 - Avelino Gomez (1964, 1965, 1966. 1967, 1972)
 5 - Sandy Hawley (1971, 1973, 1974, 1975, 1976)

Most wins by a trainer:
 7- Harry Giddings, Jr. (1911, 1912, 1913, 1915, 1920, 1933, 1936)
 5 - James E. Day (1984, 1985, 1987, 1990, 2001)

Winners

References

 The 2009 Coronation Futurity at the CTHS
 Woodbine History

Restricted stakes races in Canada
Flat horse races for two-year-olds
Horse races in Canada
Woodbine Racetrack
Recurring sporting events established in 1902